James Daniel Jordan (born February 17, 1964) is an American politician serving as the U.S. representative for  since 2007. A member of the Republican Party, Jordan is a former collegiate wrestler and college wrestling coach.

Jordan is a founding member of the conservative House Freedom Caucus, serving as its first chair from 2015 to 2017, and as its vice chair since 2017. He was the ranking member of the House Oversight Committee from 2019 to 2020. He vacated that position to become the ranking member of the House Judiciary Committee, of which he became chair in 2023.

Jordan is a close ally of former president Donald Trump. During Trump's presidency, Jordan sought to discredit investigations into Russian interference in the 2016 election and staged a sit-in to prevent a Trump impeachment inquiry hearing over the Trump-Zelenskyy telephone controversy. After Joe Biden won the 2020 presidential election and Trump tried to overturn the election, Jordan supported lawsuits to challenge the election results and voted not to certify the Electoral College results. He has refused to cooperate with the United States House Select Committee in connection with the January 6, 2021 storming of the U.S. Capitol, which subpoenaed him on May 12, 2022.

Early life and education
Jordan was born and raised in Champaign County, Ohio, the son of Shirley and John Jordan. He attended and wrestled for Graham High School, graduating in 1982. He won state championships all four years he was in high school and compiled a 156–1 win–loss record. He then enrolled at the University of Wisconsin–Madison, where he became a two-time NCAA Division I wrestling champion. Jordan won the 1985 and 1986 NCAA championship matches in the  weight class. He graduated with a bachelor's degree in economics in 1986. He lost the  featherweight semifinal match at the 1988 US Olympic wrestling trials, failing to qualify for the Olympic team.

Jordan earned a master's degree in education from Ohio State University and a Juris Doctor from the Capital University Law School. In a 2018 interview, Jordan said he never took the bar examination.

Early career

Ohio State University abuse scandal

Jordan was an assistant wrestling coach with Ohio State University's wrestling program from 1987 to 1995. Ohio State University began an independent investigation in April 2018 into allegations of sexual misconduct against former wrestling team physician Richard Strauss, who served as the team physician during Jordan's tenure as assistant coach. Strauss died by suicide in 2005.

In June 2018, at least eight former wrestlers said that Jordan had been aware of, but did not respond to, allegations of sexual misconduct by Strauss. Jordan's locker was adjacent to Strauss', and while he was assistant wrestling coach, he created and awarded a "King of the Sauna" certificate to the member of the team who spent the most time in the sauna "talking smack".

In July 2018, Jordan's congressional spokesman Ian Fury released a statement in which Ohio State wrestling coach Russ Hellickson reportedly said: "At no time while Jim Jordan was a coach with me at Ohio State did either of us ignore abuse of our wrestlers. This is not the kind of man Jim is, and it is not the kind of coach that I was."

Former wrestling team members David Range, Mike DiSabato and Dunyasha Yetts asserted that Jordan knew of Strauss's misconduct. Yetts said, "For God's sake, Strauss's locker was right next to Jordan's and Jordan even said he'd kill him if he tried anything with him". No wrestlers have accused Jordan of sexual misconduct, but four former wrestlers named him as a defendant in a lawsuit against the university. Several former wrestlers, including ex-UFC fighter Mark Coleman, allege that Hellickson contacted two witnesses in an alleged attempt to pressure them to support Jordan the day after they accused Jordan of turning a blind eye to the abuse.

Jordan has refused to cooperate with investigations into Strauss. He described his accusers as "pawns in a political plot" and said he did not even hear any locker room talk about Strauss or sexual abuse at OSU. In response to Jordan's denials, DiSabato said, "I considered Jim Jordan a friend. But at the end of the day, he is absolutely lying if he says he doesn't know what was going on."

On July 13, 2018, the editorial board of the Cleveland Plain Dealer wrote, "Jim Jordan must acknowledge what he knew".

In May 2019, DiSabato filed a Title IX lawsuit against OSU. In one count of the court papers, DiSabato alleged that a second cousin of Jordan's attempted to "intimidate and retaliate" against DiSabato. In 2019, DiSabato shared text messages with NBC News, corroborated by another former wrestler, indicating that Jordan, Russ Hellickson, and high school wrestling coach Jeff Jordan (Jim Jordan's younger brother) conspired to engage in witness tampering and intimidation when they called Coleman and Coleman's parents to pressure Coleman to recant his accusation that Jordan was aware of the abuse.

In November 2019, a retired wrestling referee filed a lawsuit alleging that he had warned Jordan and Hellickson about Strauss's misconduct but they had dismissed his warning. Jordan said that the referee was "another person making a false statement". 

In February 2020, Adam DiSabato, the brother of Mike DiSabato, testified before the Ohio House Civil Justice Committee that Jordan called him "crying, groveling... begging me to go against my brother" and described Jordan as a "coward".

Ohio General Assembly 
Jordan was elected to the Ohio House of Representatives in November 1994 and represented the 85th Ohio House district for three terms.

In 2000, Jordan was elected to the Ohio Senate over independent candidate Jack Kaffenberger with 88% of the vote. In 2004, Jordan defeated Kaffenberger again, with 79% of the vote.

U.S. House of Representatives

Elections 
Jordan represents Ohio's 4th congressional district, which stretches from Lake Erie to just below Urbana in north-central and western Ohio and includes Lima, Marion, Tiffin, Norwalk, and Elyria. He won the Republican primary for the 4th district in 2006 after 26-year incumbent Mike Oxley announced his retirement. Jordan defeated Democratic nominee Rick Siferd in the general election with 60% of the vote.

Jordan was reelected in 2008, defeating Democratic nominee Mike Carroll with 65% of the vote. In 2010, he was again reelected, defeating Democrat Doug Litt and Libertarian Donald Kissick with 71% of the vote. Jordan was reelected in 2012, 2014, 2016, 2018, 2020, and 2022.

Tenure 
Jordan chaired the Republican Study Committee during the 112th Congress, while turning down a position on the Appropriations Committee. During the U.S. government shutdown of 2013, he was considered the committee's most powerful member. That group was the primary proponent and executor of the Republican congressional strategy to bring about a government shutdown in order to force changes in the Patient Protection and Affordable Care Act, also known as Obamacare.

Jordan received a vote for Speaker of the United States House of Representatives in the 113th Congress from a fellow right-wing conservative, Tea Party Caucus chairman Tim Huelskamp. Jordan received two votes for Speaker during the 114th Congress. On July 26, 2018, he announced his bid for Speaker after Paul Ryan retired, but lost to Kevin McCarthy. His campaign ended when Democrats took the majority in the House. Subsequently, Jordan campaigned for House minority leader. Former Ohio state representative Capri Cafar said that Jordan "is someone who has built a reputation as an attack dog, someone who is media savvy, someone who is a stalwart supporter of the president and who has the skill necessary to take the lead for the GOP". He lost his bid to McCarthy in a 159–43 vote. In 2023, Jordan returned to consideration for the speakership after McCarthy failed to win it after three rounds of voting.

Jordan was the ranking member of the House Oversight Committee from 2019 to 2020. In February 2020, he left his position on the Committee on Oversight and Government Reform and replaced Doug Collins on the United States House Committee on the Judiciary. Collins was required to step down from the committee post after launching his bid in the 2020–21 United States Senate special election in Georgia. Mark Meadows replaced Jordan on the House Committee on Oversight and Government Reform.

Jordan's district has been redrawn over time to minimize urban area (such as Toledo, Columbus or Cleveland) and increase rural area; it now stretches from Lake Erie nearly to Dayton. In May 2019, a three-judge federal panel ruled Ohio's congressional district map unconstitutional due to partisan gerrymandering and ordered Ohio to create a new map in time for the 2020 election. But after the U.S. Supreme Court ruled in Rucho v. Common Cause that courts could not review allegations of gerrymandering, the district boundaries were not to change until maps were redrawn in 2022.

In December 2021, the House Select Committee on the January 6 Attack released the partial contents of a text message an unnamed lawmaker sent to White House chief of staff Mark Meadows before the scheduled final certification of presidential electors on January 6, 2021. The excerpt read: "On January 6, 2021, Vice President Mike Pence, as President of the Senate, should call out all the electoral votes that he believes are unconstitutional as no electoral votes at all." The day after the release, Jordan acknowledged sending the message, but said he had merely forwarded it after receiving it from attorney Joseph Schmitz. Both Jordan and Meadows asserted that the committee had altered the context of the excerpt by misplacing a period.

Freedom Caucus
During the 114th Congress, Jordan and eight other members of Congress founded the House Freedom Caucus, a bloc of conservatives working "to advance an agenda of limited constitutional government" in Congress. He served as the group's first chair. The caucus was ultimately credited with pushing Speaker John Boehner into retirement.

Legislation
On May 2, 2014, Jordan introduced House Resolution 565, "Calling on Attorney General Eric H. Holder, Jr., to appoint a special counsel to investigate the targeting of conservative nonprofit groups by the Internal Revenue Service". It passed on May 7, 2014. Holder, who had previously been found to be in contempt of Congress, failed to appoint a special counsel to investigate the alleged procedural abuses of IRS employees, including Lois Lerner.

In March 2017, Jordan criticized the newly introduced American Health Care Act, the Republican replacement bill for the Patient Protection and Affordable Care Act, calling it an unacceptable form of "Obamacare Lite". On May 4, 2017, he voted to pass a revised version of the legislation.

On June 13, 2018, Jordan and Representative Mark Meadows filed a resolution to compel the Department of Justice to provide certain documents to Congress relating to the ongoing congressional investigations of Russian interference in the 2016 election. The resolution asserted that the DOJ was stonewalling congressional oversight and sought to give the DOJ seven days from its enactment to turn over documents related to both Deputy Attorney General Rod Rosenstein's appointment of Special Counsel Robert Mueller as well as various decisions made by the FBI during the 2016 presidential election. Jordan issued a press release that stated: This resolution gives the DOJ seven days to turn over the documents that they owe Congress. Rod Rosenstein threatened congressional staff. When the bully picks on your little brother, you have to respond. It's time for House Leadership to stand up and pass this resolution.

On July 25, 2018, Jordan and Meadows introduced articles of impeachment against Rosenstein, whom they accused of "intentionally withholding embarrassing documents and information, knowingly hiding material investigative information from Congress, various abuses of the FISA process, and failure to comply with congressional subpoenas". Jordan stated that impeachment was necessary because: The DOJ is keeping information from Congress. Enough is enough. It's time to hold Mr. Rosenstein accountable for blocking Congress's constitutional oversight role.

Jordan and Representative Warren Davidson were the only members of Ohio's congressional delegation and two of 60 members of Congress to vote in October 2019 against a bipartisan resolution that passed the House 354–60 condemning Trump's unilateral withdrawal of U.S. military forces from Syria.

2023 Speaker election
Despite his support for Kevin McCarthy in the 2023 Speaker of the House of Representatives election, including nominating McCarthy on the second ballot, Jordan was nominated on the second ballot by Representative Matt Gaetz. He received 19 votes, enough to deny McCarthy the speakership in the second round. Jordan was nominated again on the third ballot by Chip Roy. He won 20 votes in the third ballot, with Byron Donalds switching from McCarthy to Jordan. This was enough to necessitate a fourth ballot, but Jordan got no votes on ballots 4 through 11, as all his supporters switched to Donalds. On the 12th ballot, Gaetz nominated Jordan again. He received four votes, enough to necessitate a 13th ballot when combined with the three for Kevin Hern. He was not nominated on the 13th or 14th ballot, but received six and two votes on each, respectively.

Committee assignments
 Committee on the Judiciary (chairman)
Select Subcommittee on the Weaponization of the Federal Government (chairman)
 Committee on Oversight and Government Reform
Subcommittee on Health Care, Benefits, and Administrative Rules
 Subcommittee on Government Operations
Select Subcommittee on the Coronavirus Crisis
 House Select Committee on the Events Surrounding the 2012 Terrorist Attack in Benghazi (2014-2016)
 Committee on Intelligence (temporary)

Caucus memberships
 Freedom Caucus
 Congressional Constitution Caucus
Congressional Western Caucus
U.S.-Japan Caucus
 Campus Free Speech Caucus

Political positions

According to The Dayton Daily News, Jordan "is known for being one of Congress' most conservative members".

Jordan has earned a perfect score from the American Conservative Union. He has voted consistently for anti-abortion legislation and was endorsed by Ohio Right to Life in 2012. During the 112th Congress, he was one of 40 "staunch" members of the Republican Study Committee who frequently voted against Republican party leadership and vocally expressed displeasure with House bills.

Jordan was a leading critic of President Barack Obama's Home Affordable Modification Program (HAMP) program, advocating for its shutdown.

Jordan has supported the continued production and upgrades of M1 Abrams tanks in his district.

Jordan, along with all other Senate and House Republicans, voted against the American Rescue Plan Act of 2021.

Donald Trump
Jordan has been a stalwart supporter and close ally of Trump. Asked by Anderson Cooper in April 2018 whether he had ever heard Trump tell a lie, Jordan said "I have not" and "nothing comes to mind". He also said, "I don't know that [Trump has ever] said something wrong that he needs to apologize for."

In December 2017, Jordan sought to discredit the FBI and Special Counsel Robert Mueller's investigation into Russian interference in the 2016 election. He questioned Mueller's impartiality, and called on Deputy Attorney General Rod J. Rosenstein to use his authority to disband Mueller's investigation or create a second special counsel to simultaneously investigate Mueller himself. Rosenstein rejected the request, saying that he could not appoint another special counsel as there was no credible allegation of a potential crime. The New York Times reported that Republicans were increasingly criticizing Mueller's investigation after it "delivered a series of indictments to high-profile associates of the president and evidence that at least two of them are cooperating with the inquiry". In July 2018, Jordan led efforts to impeach Rosenstein as a way to shut down Mueller's investigation. During a hearing on July 12, 2018, Jordan repeatedly interrupted FBI agent Peter Strzok while Strzok tried to explain that he couldn't answer specific questions to preserve the confidentiality of an ongoing investigation. Democrats protested Jordan's behavior, and urged their fellow senators to allow Strzok to respond. They also objected to Jordan's exceeding his allowed time for questioning. House Judiciary Committee chairman Bob Goodlatte admonished Jordan for his repeated interruptions of the witness.

In July 2018, Jordan and Mark Meadows called on the Department of Justice to "review allegations that Deputy Attorney General Rod Rosenstein threatened to subpoena phone records and documents from a House Intelligence Committee staffer". In their written request, the two wrote that in his use of investigative powers, Rosenstein had retaliated "against rank-and-file (congressional) staff members", thereby abusing his authority. To John Catsimatidis on WNYM, Jordan said he would force a vote on Rosenstein's impeachment if the DOJ did not deliver documents Congress requested.

In March 2019, House Judiciary chair Jerrold Nadler criticized Jordan for allegedly using anti-Semitic messaging by spelling the name of the 2020 presidential candidate Tom Steyer, whose father is Jewish, with a "$" in place of an "S" on Twitter while urging Nadler to resist calls for Trump's impeachment.

During Mueller's testimony to two congressional committees on July 24, 2019, Jordan asked Mueller why he never charged Joseph Mifsud with lying to the FBI while George Papadopoulos was charged for lying about Mifsud. Jordan said: "Mifsud is the guy who told Papadopoulos [about Russian dirt]. He was the guy who started it all. Yet when the FBI interviews him, he lies three times; you don't charge him." Mueller responded, "Well, I can't get into it and it's obvious, I think, that we can't get into charging decisions."

On October 23, 2019, Jordan and two dozen other Republicans staged a protest that delayed a Trump impeachment inquiry hearing. The coordinated action disrupted the United States House Permanent Select Committee on Intelligence where Republican and Democratic congressional members planned to take testimony from Deputy Assistant Secretary of Defense Laura Cooper. The group staged a sit-in outside the Sensitive Compartmented Information Facility (SCIF) hearing room. Some of the Republicans who participated already had access to the hearings since the members of the House Oversight, Intelligence and Foreign Affairs committees were welcome to attend and ask questions.
 
Describing the sit-in, Jordan said, "The members have just had it, and they want to be able to see and represent their constituents and find out what's going on." The next day, he said on Fox News, "Adam Schiff is doing this unfair, partisan process in secret and our members finally said, 'Enough'... We're so frustrated. They reached a boiling point and these guys marched in and said 'we want to know what's going on.'"

House Homeland Security Committee Chairman Bennie Thompson wrote to the House sergeant-at-arms about Jordan, Representative Bradley Byrne, and others, requesting that he take action regarding their "unprecedented breach of security". Senator Lindsey Graham admonished his House colleagues for their tactic, calling them "nuts" for having made a "run on the SCIF".

As the ranking member of the House Judiciary Committee, during a July 2020 hearing with Attorney General Bill Barr, Jordan presented a video montage that took statements by CNN reporters out of context to create the impression they were characterizing violent protests as "mostly peaceful".

In December 2020, Jordan was one of 126 Republican members of the House of Representatives to sign an amicus brief in support of Texas v. Pennsylvania, a lawsuit filed at the United States Supreme Court contesting the results of the 2020 presidential election, in which Joe Biden defeated Trump. The Supreme Court declined to hear the case on the basis that Texas lacked standing under Article III of the Constitution to challenge the results of an election held by another state. House Speaker Nancy Pelosi issued a statement that called signing the amicus brief an act of "election subversion". She reprimanded Jordan and the other House members who supported the lawsuit: "The 126 Republican Members that signed onto this lawsuit brought dishonor to the House. Instead of upholding their oath to support and defend the Constitution, they chose to subvert the Constitution and undermine public trust in our sacred democratic institutions." New Jersey Representative Bill Pascrell, citing section three of the 14th Amendment, called for Pelosi to not seat Jordan and the other Republicans who signed the brief supporting the suit, arguing that "the text of the 14th Amendment expressly forbids Members of Congress from engaging in rebellion against the United States. Trying to overturn a democratic election and install a dictator seems like a pretty clear example of that."

On January 6–7, 2021, Jordan cast a vote to prevent the certification of the Electoral College in at least one state. He was one of the 139 representatives who voted to overturn the results of the 2020 presidential election in Congress on January 7, 2021, the day after the storming of the Capitol. At a later virtual committee meeting, Jordan said the storming of the Capitol "was as wrong as wrong can be".

On January 11, 2021, Trump awarded Jordan the Presidential Medal of Freedom in a closed-door ceremony.

Cassidy Hutchinson, a former aide to Trump chief of staff Mark Meadows, testified before the House Select Committee on the January 6 Attack that Jordan had talked to the White House about presidential pardons for Republican members of Congress who participated in attempts to overturn the 2020 United States presidential election.

Health care 
Jordan opposes the Affordable Care Act, calling for it to be repealed. He opposes vaccine requirements, describing them as "un-American".

Environment
In July 2008, Jordan was the first member of Congress to sign the "No Climate Tax" pledge drafted by the conservative political advocacy group Americans for Prosperity.

In Congress, Jordan voted to open the Outer Continental Shelf to oil drilling, prevent the EPA from regulating greenhouse gases, and bar greenhouse gases from Clean Air Act rules. He voted against enforcing limits on carbon dioxide global warming pollution, tax credits for renewable electricity, tax incentives for renewable energy and energy conservation, and curtailing subsidies for oil and gas company exploration.

Abortion
Jordan opposes abortion, and supports banning federal funding to Planned Parenthood.

On July 12, 2022, Jordan tweeted to the Washington Examiner that a report of a 10-year-old Ohio girl traveling to Indiana to obtain a legal abortion after being raped was a lie. He deleted the tweet on July 13 after the rapist was arrested by police and confessed to raping the girl twice, and police confirmed that the report of her abortion in Indiana was accurate.

Antitrust and tech policy 
Jordan, a noted critic of "Big Tech" companies, opposes proposals backed by many Democrats and some Republicans (such as Ken Buck) to break up these companies through antitrust enforcement.

He argues that the Democratic Party is beholden to the interests of Big Tech companies and supports the online censorship of conservatives.

Taxes
While serving in the Ohio Senate, Jordan supported the Tax and Expenditure Limitation Amendment, a state constitutional amendment that would require a vote of the people to raise taxes or increase spending over certain limits.

Foreign policy
Jordan was among 60 Republicans to oppose condemning Trump's action of withdrawing forces from Syria. According to The American Conservative, along with Matt Gaetz and a handful of Republicans, he broke with the party and voted to end Saudi assistance to the war in Yemen.

In June 2021, Jordan was one of 49 House Republicans to vote to repeal the AUMF against Iraq.

In 2023, Jordan was among 47 Republicans to vote in favor of H.Con.Res. 21 which directed President Joe Biden to remove U.S. troops from Syria within 180 days.

LGBT rights 
In 2015, Jordan cosponsored a resolution to amend the US constitution to ban same-sex marriage. Jordan condemned the Supreme Court ruling in Obergefell v. Hodges, which held that same-sex marriage bans violated the Constitution.

Personal life 
Jordan and his wife, Polly, live near Urbana, Ohio in central Champaign County. They were introduced by her brothers, with whom Jordan competed in wrestling. Polly and Jordan started dating when he was 13 and she was 14. They have four children and two grandchildren. Jordan's son-in-law, Jarrod Uthoff, is a professional basketball player.

Political campaigns
U.S. House of Representatives, Ohio 4th District

2008 – defeated Mike Carroll.
2010 – defeated Doug Litt (D) and Donald Kissick (L).
2012 – defeated Jim Slone (D) and Chris Kalla (L).
2014 – defeated Janet Garrett (D).
2016 – defeated Janet Garrett (D).
2018 – defeated Janet Garrett (D).
2020 – defeated Shannon Freshour (D) and Steve Perkins (L).

Electoral history

See also
Conspiracy theories related to the Trump–Ukraine scandal

References

External links

 Congressman Jim Jordan official U.S. House website
 Jim Jordan for Congress
 
 
 

|-

|-

|-

|-

|-

|-

1964 births
20th-century American politicians
21st-century American politicians
American evangelicals
American male sport wrestlers
American nationalists
Christians from Ohio
Capital University Law School alumni
Living people
Republican Party members of the Ohio House of Representatives
Ohio State Buckeyes wrestling coaches
Republican Party Ohio state senators
Ohio State University College of Education and Human Ecology alumni
People from Urbana, Ohio
Protestants from Ohio
Right-wing populism in the United States
University of Wisconsin–Madison College of Letters and Science alumni
Wisconsin Badgers wrestlers
Presidential Medal of Freedom recipients
Republican Party members of the United States House of Representatives from Ohio